Hostages are people seized by a criminal abductor in order to compel another party.

Hostages or The Hostages may also refer to:

Film
 Hostages (1943 film), an American war film directed by Frank Tuttle
 The Hostages (film), a 1975 British adventure film directed by David Eady
 Hostages (1992 film), an American drama film directed by David Wheatley
 Hostages (2017 film), a Georgian drama film directed by Rezo Gigineishvili

Television
 Hostages (2022 TV series), a 2022 documentary series
 Hostages (American TV series), a 2013 drama series
 Hostages (Indian TV series), a 2019 drama web series
 Hostages (Israeli TV series), an 2013 drama series

Other uses
 Hostages (video game), a 1988 tactical shooter computer game
 The Hostages (Laurens), an 1896 painting by Jean-Paul Laurens

See also
 Hostage (disambiguation)